Eileen O'Brien (May 24, 1922 – August 30, 2015) played in the All-American Girls Professional Baseball League in 1946. With the Muskegon Lassies, she had a batting average of .111 with two hits and 18 at-bats. She later taught in public schools in Chicago.

References 

1922 births
2015 deaths
All-American Girls Professional Baseball League players
21st-century American women